Gascueña de Bornova is a municipality located in the province of Guadalajara, Castile-La Mancha, Spain. According to the 2004 census (INE), the municipality has a population of 54 inhabitants.

References

Municipalities in the Province of Guadalajara